G E Sridharan is a former India men's national volleyball team player from Tamil Nadu, India who played during the late 1970s to late 1980s. He was the second player from Tamil Nadu to receive Arjuna Award in 1982. He is the current coach for India men's national volleyball team and former coach for Tamil Nadu Volleball team. He's one of the efficient coach who took Indian youth volleyball to a new height winning gold in Asian volleyball Championship. He was awarded Dronacharya Award in 2008, which many people feel its given too late in his life, seeing his achievements list lying before.

References

Recipients of the Arjuna Award
Indian men's volleyball players
Tamil sportspeople
Recipients of the Dronacharya Award
Living people
Asian Games medalists in volleyball
Volleyball players at the 1986 Asian Games
1954 births
Volleyball players from Tamil Nadu
Medalists at the 1986 Asian Games
Asian Games bronze medalists for India